Mohan Raman, also known as Mohan V. Ram (born 3 April 1956), is an Indian actor and writer. In 2017 and 2019, he was a Jury member for the National Film Award for Best Writing on Cinema. Raman is a film historian and writes for The Hindu. He has also worked on Hindi-language films including Sabse Bada Khiladi (1995) and Chennai Express (2013).

Partial filmography

Tamil films

Hindi films

Telugu films

Dubbing artist
Raghuvir Yadav (Uyire)
Girish Karnad (Amirtham)
 Tanikella Bharani (Dhoni, Vaikuntapuram)
 Suresh Krishnamoorthi (Pulan Visaranai 2)

Television

References

External links 
 

Living people
Tamil male television actors
Tamil male actors
Male actors in Hindi cinema
Indian male television actors
Indian male film actors
20th-century Indian male actors
21st-century Indian male actors
1956 births
XLRI – Xavier School of Management alumni